S.T.U.N., which stands for 'Scream Toward The Uprising Of Non-Conformity,' were a punk band from Los Angeles, formed in 2000. Their lyrics are idealistic, with the aim of supporting universalism, socialism, abolishing class warfare, and against American imperialism, laid over punk rock reminiscent of Rage Against the Machine. They were signed to Geffen Records in 2002.

Their first and only album, Evolution of Energy, was released on June 24, 2003.

S.T.U.N's influences include The Clash, Sex Pistols, Pixies, Noam Chomsky, Daniel Quinn, Jane's Addiction, Radiohead, Depeche Mode, The Smiths, Super Furry Animals, and David Bowie.

Notes

See also 
 S.T.U.N. Interview by Mary Ellen Gustafson, Ink 19
 S.T.U.N. (Scream Toward the Uprising of Nonconformity) - Music - Neoseeker Forums (Band profile) Arcanium, Neo Era Media, Inc.

Musical groups from Los Angeles